Darius Perry (born March 13, 1999) is an American college basketball player for Hübner Nyíregyháza BS of the Nemzeti Bajnokság I/A. He has previously played college basketball for the UCF Knights of the American Athletic Conference (AAC), and the Louisville Cardinals.

High school career
Perry played basketball for Mount Vernon Presbyterian School in Sandy Springs, Georgia as a freshman. For his sophomore season, he transferred to Wheeler High School in Marietta, Georgia, and helped his team capture the Class 6A state title. As a junior, Perry averaged 15 points and 4.3 assists per game. In his senior season, he averaged 20.2 points, 5.1 assists, 4.3 rebounds and 3.1 steals per game, and helped Wheeler reach the Class 6A  state quarterfinals. A consensus four-star recruit, he committed to playing college basketball for Louisville, choosing the Cardinals over an offer from Georgia, among others.

College career
As a freshman at Louisville, Perry averaged 3.9 points and 1.5 assists per game. He averaged 5.4 points and 1.5 assists per game as a sophomore. On November 10, 2019, Perry recorded 10 points, 12 assists and five rebounds in a 78–55 win over Youngstown State. On January 25, 2020, he had a season-high 19 points and five rebounds in an 80–62 win over Clemson. In his junior season, he averaged 5.2 points and 2.5 assists per game. After the season, Perry transferred to UCF. On February 10, 2021, he posted a career-high 27 points in a 61–60 loss to Wichita State. As a senior, Perry averaged 14.7 points, 3.6 rebounds and 3.4 assists per game, earning Third Team All-American Athletic Conference (AAC) honors. He declared for the 2021 NBA draft before opting to return to UCF for his fifth season of eligibility, granted by the NCAA due to the COVID-19 pandemic.

Career statistics

College

|-
| style="text-align:left;"| 2017–18
| style="text-align:left;"| Louisville
| 36 || 3 || 14.3 || .351 || .329 || .864 || 1.2 || 1.5 || .6 || .1 || 3.9
|-
| style="text-align:left;"| 2018–19
| style="text-align:left;"| Louisville
| 33 || 11 || 16.3 || .447 || .375 || .810 || 1.4 || 1.5 || .4 || .0 || 5.4
|-
| style="text-align:left;"| 2019–20
| style="text-align:left;"| Louisville
| 31 || 26 || 19.5 || .391 || .389 || .750 || 1.5 || 2.5 || .5 || .0 || 5.2
|-
| style="text-align:left;"| 2020–21
| style="text-align:left;"| UCF
| 19 || 13 || 31.7 || .405 || .383 || .864 || 3.6 || 3.4 || 1.3 || .2 || 14.7
|-
| style="text-align:left;"| 2021–22
| style="text-align:left;"| UCF
| 30 || 29 || 29.6 || .397 || .361 || .725 || 3.9 || 4.4 || 1.6 || .2 || 11.8
|- class="sortbottom"
| style="text-align:center;" colspan="2"| Career
| 149 || 82 || 21.1 || .399 || .368 || .802 || 2.1 || 2.6 || .8 || .1 || 7.5

References

External links
UCF Knights bio
Louisville Cardinals bio

1999 births
Living people
American men's basketball players
Basketball players from Marietta, Georgia
Point guards
Louisville Cardinals men's basketball players
UCF Knights men's basketball players